The medium tree finch (Camarhynchus pauper) is a critically endangered species of bird in the Darwin's finch group of the tanager family Thraupidae. It is endemic to the Galápagos Islands where it is only found on Floreana Island. Its name is derived from the fact that the bird's beak is intermediate in size between that of the small tree finch and the large tree finch. Because it has a very small range on a single island, and because of the introduction of a parasitic fly which kills the nestlings, the International Union for Conservation of Nature has rated the medium tree finch as "critically endangered".

Distribution
This species is only found on Floreana Island at elevations above 250 meters in moist highland forest habitats. Prime breeding habitat is dominated by Scalesia pedunculata trees.

Ecology
The diurnal Galapagos short-eared owl is its only remaining natural predator. Medium tree finches generally lay two to three eggs. Eggs are incubated for approximately 12 days, and nestlings are fed by both parents at the nest for approximately 14 days before becoming fledglings.

The range of beak sizes of the medium tree finch on Floreana and the large tree finch, Camarhynchus psittacula, on Isabela is roughly the same. This reflects the fact that the two species feed on the same type and size of insect. The beak of the medium tree finch is intermediate in size between the small tree finch and large tree finch. All three species are found in the same habitat country and area.

Status
The medium tree finch is threatened by introduced predators such as rats, mice, cats and the smooth-billed ani, as well as habitat loss, which has occurred through clearance for agriculture. The introduced fly Philornis downsi is a significant threat to the survival of this species. Parasitic larvae of this fly live in the nest material and feed on the blood and body tissues of nestlings. P. downsi causes high nestling mortality in the medium tree finch. Because of this, and because it has a very small range on a single island, the International Union for Conservation of Nature has rated the medium tree finch as "critically endangered".

References

O’Connor JA, Sulloway FJ, Kleindorfer S (2010). Avian population survey in the Floreana highlands: Is Darwin's medium tree finch declining in remnant patches of Scalesia forest? Bird Conservation International. 
O’Connor JA, Sulloway FJ, Robertson J, Kleindorfer S (2010). Philornis downsi parasitism is the primary cause of nestling mortality in the critically endangered Darwin's medium tree finch (Camarhynchus pauper). Biodiversity and Conservation. 19:853-866.

External links
BirdLife Species Factsheet.

medium tree finch
Endemic birds of the Galápagos Islands
medium tree finch
Taxa named by Robert Ridgway
Taxonomy articles created by Polbot
Taxobox binomials not recognized by IUCN